James Buchanan (1791–1868) was the president of the United States from 1857 to 1861.

James Buchanan may also refer to:

Politics
James Buchanan of Drumpellier (1726–1786), British merchant, twice Lord Provost of Glasgow
James M. Buchanan (diplomat) (1803–1876), American jurist and diplomat
James Buchanan (New South Wales politician) (1827–1891), Australian politician and magistrate
James Buchanan (New Jersey politician) (1839–1900), U.S. Representative from New Jersey
James P. Buchanan (1867–1937), American congressman from Texas
James Buchanan, British East Pakistani official, 1st head of the paramilitary Bangladesh Ansars
James Buchanan (Florida politician) (born 1982), American politician, member of the Florida Legislature

Sport
Jim Buchanan (baseball) (1876–1949), baseball player
Jim Buchanan (footballer) (1898–?), Scottish professional footballer
Jim Buchanan (long jumper) (born 1955), Canadian Olympic athlete
James Buchanan (New Zealand cricketer) (1856–1921), New Zealand cricketer
James Buchanan (South African cricketer) (1908–1989), South African cricketer

Other
James M. Buchanan (1919–2013), American Nobel laureate economist
James Buchanan (minister) (1804–1870), Church of Scotland minister and theologian
James Buchanan, 1st Baron Woolavington (1849–1935), Scottish businessman, philanthropist, and racehorse owner and breeder
James Buchanan (teacher) (1849–1897), Scottish teacher and founder of St. Margaret's School, Edinburgh
James Buchanan (1785–1857), Scottish philanthropist
James S. Buchanan (1864–1930), American educator, fourth president of the University of Oklahoma
Sir James Buchanan, 2nd Baronet, British Royal Navy officer
Jim Buchanan (violinist), American violinist, member of David Grisman Quintet

See also
James Buchanan Duke (1856–1925), American industrialist
James Buchanan Eads (1820–1887), American engineer and inventor
James Buchanan Macaulay (1793–1859), Canadian lawyer
Bucky Barnes, Marvel Comics character whose full name is James Buchanan Barnes
Bucky Barnes (Marvel Cinematic Universe), film and TV adaptation of Marvel Comics character, also with the full name of James Buchanan Barnes